The 2000 Clásica de Almería was the 15th edition of the Clásica de Almería cycle race and was held on 27 February 2000. The race started in Puebla de Vícar and finished in Vera. The race was won by Isaac Gálvez.

General classification

References

2000
2000 in road cycling
2000 in Spanish sport